Bill Brown is a "nomadic" filmmaker, photographer, and author from Lubbock, Texas.

Style, output and other projects
Brown has produced films on the United States–Mexico border, North Dakota missile silos, the Trans-Canada Highway, among other places. The films have been exhibited at numerous film festivals and museums, including the Museum of Modern Art in New York. He describes his films as postcards with a pretty picture but instead of words on the back, his films are narrated with voiceover.

Brown is also the author of a zine called Dream Whip which currently has 15 issues, and the book Saugus to the Sea. In 2001 Brown received the Creative Capital Award in the Discipline of Moving Image.

Films
 Roswell (1994)
 Hub City (1996) 
 Confederation Park (1999)
 Buffalo Common (2001)
 Mountain State (2003)
 The Other Side (2006)
 Chicago Corner (2009)
 Document (2012)
 Memorial Land (2012)
 Speculation Nation (2014) co-directed by Sabine Gruffat
 Amarillo Ramp (2017) co-directed by Sabine Gruffat
 XCTRY (2018)
 Life on the Mississippi (2018)

External links
 Bill Brown's website
 Youtube films
 
 Dream Whip Zine
 Samples and Collections from Dream Whip
 Cosmic Rays Experimental Film Festival
 Zine Machine: Durham Printed Matter Festival
 Vimeo page

References

Year of birth missing (living people)
Living people
People from Lubbock, Texas
American documentary filmmakers
21st-century American novelists
Harvard University alumni
American male novelists
21st-century American male writers